Tedania aurantiaca is a species of sea sponge first found on the coast of South Georgia island, in the south west Southern Ocean.

References

External links
WORMS

Poecilosclerida
Animals described in 2012
Fauna of South Georgia